Seventh College is the seventh and newest college of the University of California, San Diego. Its primary focus is on interdisciplinary education. Seventh College enrolled its first students in Fall 2020.

References

External links 
 Official Seventh College website
 Overview of UCSD's College System
 UC San Diego College System
 UC San Diego College Comparison

University of California, San Diego
Educational institutions established in 2020
2020 establishments in California